The Society of the Holy Child Jesus is an international community of Roman Catholic sisters founded in England in 1846 by Philadelphia-born Cornelia Connelly.

History

Born Cornelia Peacock in Philadelphia, she was raised a Presbyterian. In 1831 she married Pierce Connelly, an Episcopal priest. They converted to Catholicism in 1835 and separated in 1844, when her husband decided to become a Catholic priest. Cornelia was invited to England to educate girls. There she drew up a set of rules for a new religious congregation, which she called the "Society of the Holy Child Jesus".

Bishop Nicholas Wiseman sent her to a convent at St Mary's Church, Derby, where she was soon running a day school for 200 students and training novices for her new institute. In December 1847 she took her perpetual vows as a religious sister and was formally installed as superior general of the society. In 1848, Wiseman, unable to meet expenses connected with the schools, had Cornelia relocate to his district at St. Leonard's-on-Sea in Sussex.

The Society was approved in 1887 by Pope Leo XIII, and the rules and constitutions were confirmed and ratified by him in 1893.

Expansion
In 1862 six sisters from England came to the Society to the United States. In 1930 three sisters brought the Society to Nigeria, and in 1967 four sisters began the Society’s life in Chile.

Schools

Americas
 Connelly School of the Holy Child, Potomac, Maryland (6-12)
 Cornelia Connelly High School, Anaheim, California (closed in 2020)
 Holy Child Academy, Drexel Hill, Pennsylvania (K-8)
 Holy Child Academy, Old Westbury, New York (K-8)
 Mayfield Junior School, Pasadena, California (K-8)
 Mayfield Senior School, Pasadena, California (9-12)
 Oak Knoll School of the Holy Child, Summit, New Jersey (K-6)
 Rosemont School of the Holy Child, Rosemont, Pennsylvania (K-8)
 School of the Holy Child, Rye, New York
 Holy Child Academy, Sharon Hill, Pennsylvania (closed in 1973)
 Cornelia Connelly Center, New York, NY

England
 Combe Bank School, Sundridge, Kent
 St Leonards-Mayfield School, Mayfield, East Sussex
 Convent of the Holy Child Jesus (Layton Hill Convent), Blackpool, Lancashire (merged to become St Mary's Catholic College)
 Holy Child School, Edgbaston (re-named Priory School in 2001)
 Winckley Square Convent School, Preston, Lancashire, 1875–1978

Africa

 Holy Child School, Cape Coast, Ghana
 
 Holy Child College, Southwest-Ikoyi, Lagos

Higher education
 Rosemont College, Rosemont, Pennsylvania (Originally the Joseph Sinnott Mansion).
Holy Child College of Education, Takoradi, Ghana

References

External links
 
Holy Child Network of Schools

 
Holy Child
Religious organizations established in 1846
Catholic religious institutes established in the 19th century
1846 establishments in England